Davor Landeka (born 18 September 1984) is a Bosnian professional footballer who plays as a midfielder for Bosnian Premier League club Posušje.

While playing in Zrinjski, he won two titles, the national championship and the national cup.
He played for the Bosnia-Herzegovina Under 21 team.

Honours

Zrinjski Mostar
Premier League of Bosnia and Herzegovina: 2004–05
Bosnia and Herzegovina Football Cup: 2008

Široki Brijeg
Bosnia and Herzegovina Football Cup: 2013

Career statistics

External links

Interview at Nogometni Magazin

1984 births
Living people
People from Posušje
Croats of Bosnia and Herzegovina
Association football midfielders
Bosnia and Herzegovina footballers
Bosnia and Herzegovina under-21 international footballers
HŠK Zrinjski Mostar players
HNK Rijeka players
Grasshopper Club Zürich players
NK Široki Brijeg players
NK Imotski players
HŠK Posušje players
Premier League of Bosnia and Herzegovina players
Croatian Football League players
Swiss Super League players
Bosnia and Herzegovina expatriate footballers
Expatriate footballers in Croatia
Bosnia and Herzegovina expatriate sportspeople in Croatia
Expatriate footballers in Switzerland
Bosnia and Herzegovina expatriate sportspeople in Switzerland